Estonia participated in the Eurovision Song Contest 2021 with the song "The Lucky One" written by Uku Suviste and Sharon Vaughn. The song was performed by Uku Suviste. The Estonian broadcaster  (ERR) organised the national final  in order to select the Estonian entry for the 2021 contest in Rotterdam, Netherlands. The national final consisted of three shows: two semi-finals and a final. Twelve songs competed in each semi-final and six from each semi-final as determined by a jury panel and public vote qualified to the final. In the final, the winner was selected over two rounds of voting. In the first round, a jury panel and a public vote selected the top three to qualify to the superfinal. In the superfinal, "The Lucky One" performed by Uku Suviste was selected as the winner entirely by a public vote.

Estonia was drawn to compete in the second semi-final of the Eurovision Song Contest which took place on 20 May 2021. Performing during the show in position 2, "The Lucky One" was not announced among the top 10 entries of the second semi-final and therefore did not qualify to compete in the final. It was later revealed that Estonia placed thirteenth out of the 17 participating countries in the semi-final with 58 points.

Background 

Prior to the 2021 Contest, Estonia had participated in the Eurovision Song Contest twenty-five times since its first entry in 1994, winning the contest on one occasion in 2001 with the song "Everybody" performed by Tanel Padar, Dave Benton and 2XL. Following the introduction of semi-finals for the 2004, Estonia has, to this point, managed to qualify to the final on seven occasions. In 2019, "Storm" performed by Victor Crone managed to qualify Estonia to the final where the song placed twentieth.

The Estonian national broadcaster,  (ERR), broadcasts the event within Estonia and organises the selection process for the nation's entry. ERR confirmed Estonia's participation at the 2021 Eurovision Song Contest on 18 March 2020 after the 2020 contest was cancelled due to the COVID-19 pandemic. Since their debut, the Estonian broadcaster has organised national finals that feature a competition among multiple artists and songs in order to select Estonia's entry for the Eurovision Song Contest.

Before Eurovision

Eesti Laul 2021 
 was the thirteenth edition of the Estonian national selection , which selected Estonia's entry for the Eurovision Song Contest 2021. The competition took place at the Saku Suurhall in Tallinn, hosted by Tõnis Niinemets and Grete Kuld and consisted of twenty-four entries competing in two semi-finals on 18 and 20 February 2021 leading to a twelve-song final on 6 March 2021.

Format 
The format of the competition included two semi-finals on 18 and 20 February 2021 and a final on 6 March 2021. Twelve songs competed in each semi-final and the top six from each semi-final qualified to complete the twelve song lineup in the final. The results of the semi-finals was determined by the 50/50 combination of votes from a professional jury and public televoting for the first four qualifiers and a second round of public televoting for the fifth and sixth qualifiers. The winning song in the final was selected over two rounds of voting: the first round results selected the top three songs via the 50/50 combination of jury and public voting, while the second round (superfinal) determined the winner solely by public televoting.

Competing entries 
On 1 September 2020, ERR opened the submission period for artists and composers to submit their entries up until 6 November 2020 through an online upload platform. Each artist and songwriter was only able to submit a maximum of five entries. Foreign collaborations were allowed as long as 50% of the songwriters were Estonian. A fee was also imposed on songs being submitted to the competition, with €25 for songs in the Estonian language and €75 for songs in other languages. One of the semi-finalist spots was reserved for Uku Suviste, who was to represent Estonia in the Eurovision Song Contest 2020 before the contest was cancelled. 156 submissions were received by the deadline. A 17-member jury panel selected 24 semi-finalists from the submissions and the selected songs were announced during the ETV entertainment program  on 11 and 12 November 2020. The selection jury consisted of Bert Prikenfeld (DJ), Kaupo Karelson (television producer), Jüri Pihel (television producer), Jaan Pehk (musician), Anu Varusk (Warner Music Baltics regional marketing manager), Karl-Erik Taukar (singer), Sten Teppan (Vikerradio music editor), Mari-Liis Männik (Raadio Elmar presenter), Ahto Kruusmann (Raadio Uuno presenter), Margus Kamlat (Raadio 2 presenter), Laura Põldvere (singer), Vaido Pannel (Raadio Sky+ music editor), Robert Kõrvits (musician), Rauno Märks (Retro FM presenter), Dmitri Mikrjukov (Raadio 4 music editor), Andres Aljaste (Power Hit Radio presenter) and Liis Lemsalu (singer).

Among the competing artists were previous Eurovision Song Contest entrants Ivo Linna, who represented Estonia in 1996 with Maarja-Liis Ilus, Koit Toome, who represented Estonia in 1998 and in 2017 with Laura, Tanja, who represented Estonia in 2014, and Jüri Pootsmann, who represented Estonia in 2016. Andrei Zevakin (previously among Xtra Basic), Egert Milder, Kaire Vilgats (member of Suured tüdrukud), Karl Killing, Kéa, Kristel Aaslaid (lead singer of Gram-Of-Fun), Nika Marula, Redel (previously among Winny Puhh), Robert Linna (previously among Elephant from Neptune), Sissi, Tuuli Rand, Uku Suviste and some members of Wiiralt (Martin, Mihkel and Sander) have all competed in previous editions of Eesti Laul.

Semi-finals
Two semi-finals took place on 18 and 20 February 2021. In each semi-final twelve songs competed for the first four spots in the final with the outcome decided upon by the combination of the votes from a jury panel consisting of Kerli Kõiv, Heidy Purga, Sünne Valtri, Janika Sillamaa, Anett Kulbin, Nele Kirsipuu, Kristjan Järvi, Koit Raudsepp, Silver Laas, Andres Puusepp and Genka and a public televote. The remaining two qualifiers were decided by an additional televote between the remaining non-qualifiers.

In addition to the performances of the competing entries, Elina Born, who represented Estonia in the Eurovision Song Contest 2015, and singers Beebilõust and Villemdrillem performed as the interval acts in semi-final 1, and singer Daniel Levi and the group Curly Strings performed as the interval acts in semi-final 2.

Final
The final took place on 6 March 2021. The six entries that qualified from each of the two preceding semi-finals, all together twelve songs, competed during the show. The winner was selected over two rounds of voting. In the first round, an international jury (50%) and public televote (50%) determined the top three entries to proceed to the superfinal. The public vote in the first round registered 55,956 votes. In the superfinal, "The Lucky One" performed by Uku Suviste was selected as the winner entirely by a public televote. The public televote in the superfinal registered 52,214 votes. In addition to the performances of the competing entries,  singers Liis Lemsalu and Stefan, and the groups Goresoerd, Mr. Lawrence, Pitsa and Smilers performed as the interval acts. The international jury panel that voted in the first round of the final consisted of Moniqué (Lithuanian singer), Brian Henry (British keyboardist), Ben Camp (American songwriter), Sylvia Massy (American producer), Jan Frost Bors (Czech screenwriter), Stephen Budd (British producer), Helena Meraai (Belarusian singer), Pierre Dumoulin (Belgian songwriter) and Steve Rodway (British composer).

At Eurovision 
According to Eurovision rules, all nations with the exceptions of the host country and the "Big Five" (France, Germany, Italy, Spain and the United Kingdom) are required to qualify from one of two semi-finals in order to compete for the final; the top ten countries from each semi-final progress to the final. The European Broadcasting Union (EBU) split up the competing countries into six different pots based on voting patterns from previous contests, with countries with favourable voting histories put into the same pot. The semi-final allocation draw held for the Eurovision Song Contest 2020 on 28 January 2020 was used for the 2021 contest, which Estonia was placed into the second semi-final, to be held on 20 May 2021, and was scheduled to perform in the first half of the show.

Once all the competing songs for the 2021 contest had been released, the running order for the semi-finals was decided by the shows' producers rather than through another draw, so that similar songs were not placed next to each other. Estonia was set to perform in position 2, following the entry from San Marino and before the entry from Czech Republic.

The two semi-finals and the final were broadcast in Estonia on ETV with commentary in Estonian by Marko Reikop, and on ETV+ with commentary in Russian by Aleksandr Hobotov and Julia Kalenda. For the first time in the history of the contest, all three shows were broadcast in Estonia with Estonian sign language translation, provided by twenty interpreters. The Estonian spokesperson, who announced the top 12-point score awarded by the Estonian jury during the final, was Sissi.

Semi-final 
Estonia performed second in the second semi-final, following the entry from San Marino and preceding the entry from Czech Republic. At the end of the show, Estonia was not announced among the top 10 entries in the second semi-final and therefore failed to qualify to compete in the final. It was later revealed that Estonia placed 13th in the semi-final, receiving a total of 58 points: 29 points from both the televoting and the juries.

Voting 
Voting during the three shows involved each country awarding two sets of points from 1-8, 10 and 12: one from their professional jury and the other from televoting. Each nation's jury consisted of five music industry professionals who are citizens of the country they represent. This jury judged each entry based on: vocal capacity; the stage performance; the song's composition and originality; and the overall impression by the act. In addition, each member of a national jury may only take part in the panel once every three years, and no jury was permitted to discuss of their vote with other members or be related in any way to any of the competing acts in such a way that they cannot vote impartially and independently. The individual rankings of each jury member in an anonymised form as well as the nation's televoting results were released shortly after the grand final.

Below is a breakdown of points awarded to Estonia and awarded by Estonia in the second semi-final and grand final of the contest, and the breakdown of the jury voting and televoting conducted during the two shows:

Points awarded to Estonia

Points awarded by Estonia

Detailed voting results
The following members comprised the Estonian jury:
 Dave Benton
 Elina Born
 Stig Rästa
 Karl-Ander Reismann
 Birgit Sarrap

References

External links 
 

2021
Countries in the Eurovision Song Contest 2021
Eurovision